Roderick McEwen (12 March 1932 – 16 October 1982),  known as Rory McEwen, was a Scottish artist and musician.

Early life and education

Roderick McEwen was the fourth of seven children born to Sir John Helias Finnie McEwen and Lady Bridget Mary, daughter of Sir Francis Oswald Lindley and great-granddaughter of botanist and illustrator John Lindley, who in 1840 was instrumental in saving The Royal Botanic Gardens at Kew from destruction.

McEwen was educated at the family home, Marchmont House in the Scottish Borders, by a French governess named Mademoiselle Philippe, and at Eton where he was taught by Wilfred Blunt who described him as "perhaps the most gifted artist to pass through my hands".  After his National Service in The Queen's Own Cameron Highlanders, he gained a degree in English at Trinity College, Cambridge, where, among others, he became friends with Karl Miller, Dudley Moore, Peter Cook, Jonathan Miller and Mark Boxer.

Career
In 1955 he wrote and performed in Between the Lines at the 1955 Cambridge Footlights Revue production at the Scala Theatre in London.

In 1956, he travelled with his younger brother Alexander on the Cunarder Ascania to New York in search of Lead Belly's widow, Martha. When they found her she was so impressed by their understanding of, and skill at, playing her late husband's music, that she allowed Rory to play Lead Belly's custom-made 12-string Stella guitar, inspiring him to set off to find his own. The brothers played their way across America, cutting 'Scottish Songs and Ballads' for Smithsonian Folkways Records, and appearing on the coast-to-coast Ed Sullivan Show on CBS, twice, before returning home to Britain.

By 1957, McEwen had become one of the leading lights in the post-war folksong revival, and was a regular on the daily BBC Tonight TV programme presented by Cliff Michelmore, writing and performing topical calypsos, whilst also working as the art director for the Spectator magazine.

In the early 1960s, Rory and Alex hosted their own live shows to sell-out audiences at three successive Edinburgh Festivals. George Melly, the Clancy Brothers, Dave Swarbrick (later of Fairport Convention), Bob Davenport and the Americans Dick Farina and Carolyn Hester were among their guests.

In 1963 and 1964, McEwen presented and performed on the folk and blues music programme Hullabaloo for commercial ATV television.

Among his closest artist friends were Jim Dine, Brice Marden, Cy Twombly, Robert Graham, Kenneth Armitage, Derek Boshier and David Novros. Among close poet friends were the Portuguese Alberto de Lacerda and the Americans Kenneth Koch and Ron Padgett.  It was typical of Rory McEwen's Scottish internationalism and versatility that, as an offshoot of his admiration for Indian music, George Harrison took sitar lessons from Ravi Shankar in his house, and that he visited Bhutan in the last days before tourism.

Painting
From 1964, he decided to devote himself entirely to his career in visual art, his floral interest also finding expression in colour-refracting perspex sculpture and large abstract works in glass and steel using perspex. In painting he forged his own interpretation of international minimalism, creating works in watercolour on velum, of flowers, leaves and vegetables.

His work is in the British Museum, V&A, Tate Gallery, Scottish National Gallery of Modern Art, Hunt Institute, Pittsburgh and MOMA, New York, among other collections. A previously unknown painting by McEwen of Fritillaria gibbosa was purchased by the Royal Horticultural Society in 2018.

Personal life
On 15 April 1958, Rory married debutante Romana von Hofmannsthal (d. 2014), a graduate of Sarah Lawrence College. She was the daughter of Raimund von Hofmannsthal and Ava Alice Astor.  Her grandparents were Hugo von Hofmannsthal, Strauss's librettist and founder of the Salzburg Festival, and Americans Ava Lowle Willing (who later became Lady Ribblesdale) and John Jacob Astor IV, the multi-millionaire investor, inventor and writer, who drowned on the Titanic. They had four children, including Christabel McEwen, who married Edward Lambton, 7th Earl of Durham. They divorced in 1995 and in 2005 she married the musician Jools Holland.

In the summer of 1982 McEwen was diagnosed with terminal cancer.  On 16 October, suffering and in a state of despair, he threw himself under a train at South Kensington tube station. He was 50.

Publications
Tulips and Tulipomania, with Wilfred Blunt
Old Carnations and Pinks with Oscar C. Moreton (and an introduction by Sacheverell Sitwell)
The Auricula, Its History and Character with Oscar C. Moreton 
From the Air with Kenneth Koch 
Rory McEwen The Colours of Reality edited by Martyn Rix

Exhibitions
1962: 	Durlacher Bros., New York
1964: 	
Andre Weill Gallery, Paris
The Hunt Botanical Library, Pittsburgh
National Assembly Rooms, Edinburgh
Gateway Theatre, Edinburgh 
1965: 	Durlacher Bros., New York
1966: 	Douglas and Foulis, Edinburgh
1967:	
Richard Demarco Gallery, Edinburgh
Byron Gallery, New York
1968: 	
Richard Demarco Gallery, Edinburgh
Kunsthalle, Düsseldorf
1969: 	Richard Demarco Gallery, Edinburgh
1970: 	Richard Demarco Gallery, Edinburgh
1971: 	Scottish Arts Council
1972: 	
Redfern Gallery, London
Sonnabend Gallery, New York 
1974: 	
Redfern Gallery, London
Tooth's Gallery, London
1975:	Oxford Gallery, Oxford
1976: 	Redfern Gallery, London
1977:	Oxford Gallery, Oxford
1978:	ICA, London
1979: 	Taranman Gallery, London
1980: 	Nihonbash Gallery, Tokyo
1981: 	
Redfern Gallery, London
Fischer Fine Art. London
1982: 	
Steampfli Gallery, New York
Wave Hill, New York
1983: 	Hunt Institute, Pittsburgh
1984:	Museum of Modern Art, New York
1988: 	Royal Botanical Gardens Edinburgh, and the Serpentine Gallery, London
2013: Shirley Sherwood Gallery of Botanical Art at Kew Gardens, London

Discography
Rory and Alex McEwen, Scottish Songs and Ballads, Smithsonian Folkways Records 1957
Rory and Alex McEwen and Isla Cameron, Folksong Jubilee, His Master's Voice 1958
Rory and Alex McEwen, and Carolyne and Dick Farina,Four For Fun, Waverly Records 1963
Jim Dine and Rory McEwen, Songs, Poems and Prints, Museum of Modern Art, New York 1969

References

1932 births
1982 suicides
20th-century Scottish musicians
Scottish artists
Scottish folk musicians
Suicides in Kensington
Younger sons of baronets
1982 deaths
Suicides by train